Jason John Greenslade (born 6 March 1970) is a Welsh international indoor and lawn bowler. After moving to Guernsey in 2022 he later represented them in competition.

Bowls career

Outdoors
Greenslade took up bowling at the age of eight after his parents (both Welsh internationals) introduced him to the sport.

In 2001, he won the Hong Kong International Bowls Classic singles title.

He has competed three Commonwealth Games in the 2002 Commonwealth Games at Heaton Park, Manchester (where he won a bronze in the fours, in the 2006 Commonwealth Games at the John Cain Memorial Park in Thornbury, Victoria, Australia and in the 2010 Commonwealth Games at the Yamuna Sports Complex in Delhi. His outdoor club is Dinas Powys. In 2009 he won the pairs gold medal and singles bronze medal at the Atlantic Bowls Championships.

He was the Welsh National singles champion in 2011 as 2014  and won the singles at the British Isles Bowls Championships in 2015.

Indoors
Greenslade finished runner-up to Andy Thomson in the 2012 World Indoor Bowls Championship and runner-up twice in the Pairs in the 2003 World Indoor Bowls Championship and 2007 World Indoor Bowls Championship with partner Robert Weale. He also won a bronze medal at the 2004 World Outdoor Bowls Championship in the pairs again with Robert Weale.

Individual success includes the 2004 Scottish Masters and 2006 Welsh International Open but his greatest achievement indoors was winning the Open pairs with bowls partner Les Gillett at the 2017 World Indoor Bowls Championship in Great Yarmouth. His indoor club is Sully.

References

External links
 
 

1970 births
Living people
Welsh male bowls players
Indoor Bowls World Champions
Commonwealth Games medallists in lawn bowls
Commonwealth Games bronze medallists for Wales
Bowls players at the 2002 Commonwealth Games
Bowls players at the 2006 Commonwealth Games
Bowls players at the 2010 Commonwealth Games
Sportspeople from Penarth
Medallists at the 2002 Commonwealth Games